Andropolia olga is a species of cutworm or dart moth in the family Noctuidae. It is found in North America.

The MONA or Hodges number for Andropolia olga is 9572.

References

Further reading

 
 
 

Xylenini
Articles created by Qbugbot
Moths described in 1911
Moths of North America